is a song by Japanese singer-songwriter Rina Aiuchi from her second studio album, Power of Words (2002). Aiuchi wrote the lyrics for the song whilst her frequent collaborator, Aika Ohno wrote the music and Akihito Tokunaga arranged the song. The song was released as a CD single by Giza Studio on 14 February 2002 as the fourth single from the album. A pop ballad J-pop song, it is recognized as a wedding song. The song reached number five in Japan and has sold over 70,590 copies nationwide.

Track listing

Charts

Weekly charts

Certification and sales

|-
! scope="row"| Japan (RIAJ)
| 
| 70,590
|-
|}

Release history

References

2002 singles
2002 songs
J-pop songs
Songs written by Aika Ohno
Song recordings produced by Daiko Nagato